Nimigen Island (previously: Kemisuack, Kemisoke, Kimersok, Kimisoke) is an uninhabited Baffin Island offshore island located in the Arctic Archipelago in Nunavut's Qikiqtaaluk Region.

History
In the mid 19th century, the island supported a whaling industry.

References

External links 
 Nimigen Island in the Atlas of Canada - Toporama; Natural Resources Canada

Islands of Baffin Island
Islands of Cumberland Sound
Uninhabited islands of Qikiqtaaluk Region